Carlo Felice Bianchi "Cici" Anderloni (7 April 1916 – 7 August 2003) was an Italian automobile designer, known for several designs for the Carrozzeria Touring Superleggera company.

After studying at the Politecnico di Milano he joined his father Felice Bianchi Anderloni (1882–1949) at his company Carrozzeria Touring Superleggera (1944) and subsequently led the design and production activities, after his father's death (1949).  He was first involved in the Alfa Romeo 6C 2500 SS coupe (1949) and the
Ferrari 166 S (in barchetta body).  The company was discontinued (1966) and Anderloni joined Alfa Romeo as advisor and later, as designer.  Later he was involved in the Associazione Italiana per la Storia dell'Automobile, was a frequently used judge at the Concorso d'Eleganza Villa d'Este exhibitions, and led the Touring registry (1995-).

Literature
 Giacomo Tavoletti, Il signor Touring: Carlo Felice Bianchi Anderloni (Automobilia, 2004)

References

Italian automobile designers
1916 births
2003 deaths
Polytechnic University of Milan alumni